Mind's Eye Entertainment is a Canadian film and television production and distribution company headquartered in Regina, Saskatchewan, Canada. The company produces television and film projects in Canada and the United States as well as internationally. Mind's Eye Entertainment was founded by Kevin DeWalt and Ken Krawczyk in 1986. The company has produced more than sixty films and television series and has received over fifty national and international film awards.

History
Mind's Eye Entertainment was formed in 1986 by Kevin DeWalt and Ken Krawczyk. In 1989, the company produced their first drama project, The Great Electrical Revolution, a short film written by Ken Mitchell. The film was produced in collaboration with National Film Board of Canada. In 1997, Mind's Eye Entertainment and Condor Films jointly produced Richard Chamberlain starrer The Lost Daughter. The same year, the company produced season 1 of Incredible Story Studios, a 65-episode dramatic television series, which aired for 5 seasons from 1997 to 2002 on YTV. The following year, the company produced a drama science fiction fantasy series, Mentors, for Family Channel that included 52 episodes. The series was aired for 4 seasons with Discovery Kids airing in the United States and Latin America whereas NHK aired Japanese dubbed version of the series in Japan.

In the year 1995, Mind's Eye Entertainment produced Decoy featuring Peter Weller and Robert Patrick. In 1999, Mind's Eye Entertainment collaborated with Trimark Pictures and Original Film and produced Held Up, featuring Jamie Foxx and Nia Long. In 2001, The Unsaid featuring Andy Garcia was released. In 2003, the company produced and released One Last Dance starring Patrick Swayze followed by Falling Angels featuring Callum Keith Rennie. Falling Angels received six nominations at the 2004 Genie Awards winning two awards

Between 2001 and 2006, Mind's Eye Entertainment produced and released multiple television series including MythQuest, Just Cause, 2030 CE and Prairie Giant: The Tommy Douglas Story. In 2004, the company produced Intern Academy, a comedy film written and directed by Dave Thomas followed by Seven Times Lucky, a crime drama directed by Gary Yates.

The Englishman's Boy, a made-for-television limited series, was produced by Mind's Eye Entertainment for CBC Television in the year 2008. The film was based on the Governor General's Award winning novel by Guy Vanderhaeghe. The Englishman's Boy received six Gemini Awards that year including Best TV movie or Mini Series. In 2009, the company produced four feature films including Walled In with Mischa Barton, Grace, The Shortcut and Dolan's Cadillac with Wes Bentley and Christian Slater.

Between 2010 and 2013, Mind's Eye Entertainment produced six films including Faces in the Crowd featuring Milla Jovovich and The Tall Man featuring Jessica Biel. In 2015, Mind's Eye Entertainment produced and released Kiefer Sutherland and Donald Sutherland starrer revisionist western film, Forsaken. The film was nominated for five awards at the 4th Canadian Screen Awards. In 2017, the company produced and released The Recall featuring Wesley Snipes and The Humanity Bureau featuring Nicolas Cage.

Christina Ricci and John Cusack starred in Mind's Eye Entertainment's Distorted in 2018. In 2019, the company produced and released two films, Daughter of the Wolf featuring Gina Carano and Richard Dreyfuss was released in June whereas A Score to Settle featuring Nicolas Cage was released in the month of August. In 2020, Mind's Eye Entertainment produced a fantasy romantic drama film, Endless, featuring Alexandra Shipp, Nicholas Hamilton and Famke Janssen. Later that year, Mind's Eye Entertainment co-produced a Mexican-Spanish film, The Day of the Lord, which was distributed and released by Netflix in October.

In 2021, Mind's Eye Entertainment co-produced Dangerous starring Scott Eastwood, Kevin Durand, Tyrese Gibson, Famke Janssen and Mel Gibson. The film was released by Lionsgate in the month of November. Mind's Eye Entertainment recently announced development on Black Cyclone to be directed by Canadian director icon Clement Virgo.

In its existence of over three decades, Mind's Eye Entertainment has produced over 60 television series and theatrically-released films. The company is seen as instrumental in building the Canadian film and television industry, with projects sold in over 200 countries around the world.

Filmography

Film

Television series

References

External links
 

Film distributors of the United States
Film distributors of Canada
Film production companies of the United States
Film production companies of Canada
Companies based in Regina, Saskatchewan
Universal Pictures
American companies established in 1986
Canadian companies established in 1986
1986 establishments in Saskatchewan
Mass media companies established in 1986